The Monetary Union Index of Consumer Prices (MUICP) is a weighted average of European Monetary Union countries' HICP (Harmonised Index of Consumer Prices). It is widely used a measure of inflation throughout the Eurozone - the countries with the euro as their currency.

References

See also 
 Harmonised Index of Consumer Prices
 Consumer price index
 Inflation

Price indices